Fengshen is the romanization of several Chinese words, (or ) may refer to:

 Investiture of the Gods (Fengshen Bang), a Chinese epic fantasy novel written during the Ming Dynasty
 Hoshin Engi a Japanese anime loosely based on the Investiture of the Gods
 Dongfeng Fengshen, a Chinese automobile marque owned by Dongfeng Motor Group
 Typhoon Fengshen (2002), a Category 5 super typhoon which took place in the West Pacific in July 2002
 Typhoon Fengshen (2008), a Category 3 typhoon which killed more than 1,300 people in June 2008, primarily in the Philippines

See also
 Feng Sheng (disambiguation)
 List of wind deities